Hoplocampa is a genus of hymenopteran sawfly in the family Tenthredinidae.

Species list 

According to:
 Hoplocampa marlatti
 Hoplocampa oregonensis

According to:
 Hoplocampa cookei (Clarke)
 Hoplocampa testudinea (Klug)

According to ? :
 Hoplocampa brevis - Hoplocampe of the pear
 Hoplocampa flava - Hoplocampe of the plum
 Hoplocampa testudinea - Hoplocampe of the apple
 Hoplocampa minuta - black prune tree Hoplocampe

Description 
The female usually lays its eggs on flowers.

The larva is a "false-caterpillar" which feed on the young fruit.

Reproduction is usually parthenogenetic. The yellow prune tree sawfly (Hoplocampa flava) is very common.

Treatments 
At the start of vegetation (10 to 15 days before flowering), install white glued bands on the trees at a height of about 0.70 to 1 meter. When the adults get active, they mistake them for flowers and get stuck on them.

Idem for the cherry sawfly but with yellow bands.

References

External links 

Tenthredinidae
Insect pests of temperate forests